In enzymology, an acetone carboxylase is an enzyme that catalyzes the chemical reaction

acetone + CO2 + ATP + 2 H2O  acetoacetate + AMP + 2 phosphate

The 4 substrates of this enzyme are acetone, CO2, ATP, and H2O, whereas its 3 products are acetoacetate, AMP, and phosphate.

This enzyme belongs to the family of ligases, specifically those forming carbon-carbon bonds.  The systematic name of this enzyme class is acetone:carbon-dioxide ligase (AMP-forming).

References

 

EC 6.4.1
Enzymes of unknown structure